Steven Mark Hunt (born 14 October 1988) is a former South African rugby union player. He represented the South African sevens team between 2010 and 2014 and also played for Western Province in 2009 and 2011.

He announced his retirement from professional rugby in May 2015 to pursue his career as a commercial property broker.

Career

Youth and Currie Cup

He then moved to Cape Town where he joined .

Sevens

Hunt became involved in rugby sevens with the South African Sevens team and made his debut during the 2010 Wellington Sevens leg of the 2009–10 IRB Sevens World Series.

He was named in the Blitzbokke squad for the Hong Kong and Japan legs of the Sevens Series. and came in as injury cover for the 2013 South Africa Sevens at the Nelson Mandela Bay Stadium in Port Elizabeth, where he was a member of the squad that defeated New Zealand 26–17 in the finals.

In 2014, he scored a hat trick against Kenya on Day 1 of the Gold Coast Sevens. It helped contribute to South Africa booking a spot in the quarter-finals.

Hunt sustained a fractured foot during training prior to the 2015 Hong Kong Sevens, which ruled him out for the rest of the series.

References

1988 births
Living people
South African rugby union players
Western Province (rugby union) players
South Africa international rugby sevens players
Rugby union wings
Sportspeople from Port Elizabeth
World Games gold medalists
Competitors at the 2013 World Games
Alumni of Grey High School